Men's Giant Slalom World Cup 1999/2000

Final point standings

In Men's Slalom World Cup 1999/2000 the all results count.

References
 fis-ski.com

World Cup
FIS Alpine Ski World Cup slalom men's discipline titles